Duncan Taylor is an independent alcoholic beverages company. Based in Huntly, Scotland, it a family owned alcoholic beverage bottling company.

The brands include Black Bull (Scotch Whisky), Indian Summer, Smokin', The Octave, The Rarest, and Tantalus.

History 
Duncan Taylor was founded in Glasgow in 1938 as a cask broker and trading company. Over the decades, the company built strong ties with distillers and distilleries over Scotland, with the company bringing their own casks to the distilleries to be filled with new make spirit. This resulted in a collection of cask whiskies distilleries – many of which are now closed – which are still maturing in the Duncan Taylor warehouses today.

The company was acquired by Euan Shand in 2001, whose experience in the industry has included stints at the Glendronach distillery, William Teacher's & Sons, and founding and running The Bennachie Whisky Company. Euan subsequently moved Duncan Taylor to his home town of Huntly, acquired a facility in the town which he converted to a bottling plant, and established Duncan Taylor as an independent bottling company.

Brands 
Duncan Taylor has a portfolio of brands. Including:

Gin
Indian Summer

Rum
The Duncan Taylor Caribbean Rum
The Duncan Taylor Single Cask Rum

Blended Scotch Whisky
Black Bull (Scotch Whisky)
Scottish Glory
Smokin'

Blended Malt Scotch Whisky
Auld Reekie
The Big Smoke

Single Malt Scotch Whisky
Battlehill
Dimensions
The Duncan Taylor Single
The Duncan Taylor Tantalus
The Octave
The Rarest

Awards 
Some Duncan Taylor & Co brands have received awards in various editions of Jim Murray's Whisky Bible.

A North British 1978, cask Q247, 54.7% abv from the Rare Auld range received a "Liquid Gold Award" in the 2010 Whisky Bible (awards are granted to any whiskies which score 94 or above out of a maximum 100 points). The single cask grain whisky was also rated "Scotch Grain of the Year".

Based on ratings by blind tasting panels, Duncan Taylor & Co was awarded the "Independent Bottlers of Year" award from Whisky Magazine in 2006 (Highlands, Lowlands & Blended categories), 2007 (Lowlands), 2008 (Lowlands), and 2011 (Islay).

References

External links

Companies based in Aberdeenshire
Food and drink companies established in 1938